The 1969 Tour de Suisse was the 33rd edition of the Tour de Suisse cycle race and was held from 12 June to 20 June 1969. The race started in Zürich and finished in Zurzach. The race was won by Vittorio Adorni of the Scic team.

General classification

References

1969
Tour de Suisse